Hamzang (also Romanized as Hamzāng) is a village in Sirik Rural District, Byaban District, Minab County, Hormozgan Province, Iran. At the 2006 census, its population was 309, in 57 families.

References 

Populated places in Minab County